Kudeyar is a Russian legendary folk hero whose story is told in Mykola Kostomarov's 1875 novel of the same name.

According to this legend, Kudeyar was the elder brother of Ivan the Terrible. His mother purportedly was Solomonida Saburova, whom Vasily III divorced on account of her barrenness and incarcerated in a convent. Several months after the controversial divorce she bore a son, who was smuggled to the Cossacks living along the Don River, where he became their fearless ataman and champion in the manner of Robin Hood.

Actually, there were several Cossack robbers of this name. There is a letter of one Muscovite boyar to Ivan IV from Crimea, where he reports that "there is only one brigand left here - the accursed Kudeyar". The name is apparently Persian, composed of two elements standing for "god" and "man".

1875 Russian novels
Russian historical novels
Russian folklore characters
Don Cossacks